Jorge Briz Abularach (born 27 September 1955) is a Guatemalan politician who served as  his country's foreign minister from July 2004 to July 2006 and president of Guatemala's Chamber of Commerce.

See also
 Politics of Guatemala

1955 births
Living people
Foreign ministers of Guatemala
Podemos (Guatemala) politicians
Place of birth missing (living people)
21st-century Guatemalan politicians